Scaevatula is a genus of small predatory sea snails, marine gastropod mollusks in the family Clavatulidae.

Most gastropod species, and especially the marine species, have a dextral shell. The genus Scaevatula represents an exception to this rule, as the species are sinister. Within the family Clavatulidae, the extinct species  Clavatula aralica (Luković, 1924)  is the only other exception.

Species
Species within the genus Scaevatula include:
 Scaevatula amancioi Rolan & Fernandes, 1992
 Scaevatula pellisserpentis Gofas, 1990
 † Scaevatula sidoniae (Hoernes & Auinger, 1891)

References

 Gofas, S. (1990) Scaevatula n. gen., a sinistral clavatuline turrid from West Africa. Archiv für Molluskenkunde, 120, 11–22